Operation Desert Scorpion was an American response to the crises between the United Nations and Iraq in February 1998. Sadam Hussein provoked the United Nations by refusing to live up to his obligations to allow full access to his military sites for inspection. American military units deployed to the region (Operation Desert Thunder), in support of a number of options. 

Operation Desert Scorpion was a contingency plan that called for a single American division (the 24th Infantry Division), reinforced by some Marine units, to drive from Kuwait north to beyond Basra, cutting Iraq in half and hopefully provoking widespread rebellions. 

This option was not carried out, as the United Nations Secretary General was able to negotiate a peaceful solution.

Iraq–United States relations